Schneider v. State of New Jersey, 308 U.S. 147 (1939), was a United States Supreme Court decision that combined four similar appeals (Schneider v. State of New Jersey (Town of Irvington), Young v. People of the State of California, Snyder v. City of Milwaukee, Nichols et al. v. Commonwealth of Massachusetts), each of which presented the question whether regulations embodied in municipal ordinances abridged the First Amendment rights of freedom of speech and of the press secured against state invasion by the Fourteenth Amendment of the Constitution.

The appellants (Jehovah's Witnesses) were charged with a violation of a local ordinance that barred persons from distributing handbills on public streets or handing them out door-to-door.

Representation
 Joseph F. Rutherford, with whom Mr. Hayden C. Covington was on the brief, for petitioner in No. 11.
 Robert I. Morris argued the cause, and Messrs. Meyer Q. Kessel and Joseph C. Braelow were on the brief, for respondent in No. 11.
 Osmond K. Fraenkel, with whom Carol King and Mr. A.L. Wirin were on the brief, for appellant in No. 13.
 Ray L. Chesebro, Frederick Von Schrader, Leon T. David, John L. Bland, and Bourke Jones submitted for appellee in No. 13.
 A.W. Richter, with whom Mr. Osmond K. Fraenkel was on the brief, for petitioner in No. 18.
 Carl F. Zeidler argued the cause, and Mr. Walter J. Mattison was on the brief, for respondent in No. 18.
 Sidney S. Grant and Osmond K. Fraenkel for appellants in No. 29.
 Edward O. Proctor, Assistant Attorney General of Massachusetts, with whom Mr. Paul A. Dever, Attorney General, was on the brief, for appellee in No. 29.

Decision
In 1939, the U.S. Supreme Court held that the purpose of the ordinances to keep the streets clean and of good appearance was insufficient to justify prohibiting defendants from handing out literature to other persons willing to receive it. Any burden imposed upon the city authorities in cleaning and caring for the streets as an indirect consequence of such distribution resulted from the constitutional protection of the freedom of speech and press. Concerning the distribution of materials from house to house without a permit, the ordinance was void. 

This right is not absolute, however. Municipalities may lawfully regulate the conduct of those using the streets, for the purpose of keeping them open and available for movement of people and property, so long as legislation to this end does not abridge the constitutional liberty of one rightfully upon the street to impart information through speech or the distribution of literature.

See also
List of United States Supreme Court cases, volume 308
Lovell v. City of Griffin

External links
 
 

United States Supreme Court cases
1939 in United States case law
United States Free Speech Clause case law
Jehovah's Witnesses litigation in the United States
United States Supreme Court cases of the Hughes Court
Christianity and law in the 20th century
1939 in religion